The Northeast Power Coordinating Council (NPCC) was formed January 19, 1966, as a successor to the Canada–United States Eastern Interconnection (CANUSE). It was formed in order to improve reliability of electric service. NPCC is one of six regional entities under North American Electric Reliability Corporation (NERC) authority.  NERC and the regional reliability councils were formed following the Northeast Blackout of 1965.  NPCC's offices are located in New York City, New York.

The NPCC region lies within the Eastern Interconnection and occupies the greater New England region of North America, covering all of the States of Maine, Vermont, New Hampshire, Massachusetts, New York, Connecticut, Rhode Island, and the Provinces of Ontario, Québec, New Brunswick, Nova Scotia and Prince Edward Island.  NPCC also has ties to non-NERC systems in eastern Canada.  In terms of load served, NPCC covers 20% of the Eastern interconnection's total load demand, and 70% of Canada's entire demand.

The Hydro-Québec system, which encompasses all of Québec, is commonly considered as part of the Eastern Interconnection even though it technically is a separate interconnection. It is tied to rest of the NPCC and Eastern Interconnection through four high voltage direct current ties.

At the time of its formation in 1966, NPCC had 22 utility systems as members. As of 2019, NPCC has 90 members.

See also
North American Electric Reliability Corporation (NERC)
List of major power outages

References

External links

Electric power transmission system operators in the United States
Electric power transmission system operators in Canada
Eastern Interconnection
Companies based in New York City
Energy companies established in 1966
1966 establishments in the United States